Hyperprosopon is a genus of surfperches native to the eastern Pacific Ocean.

Species
There are currently three recognized species in this genus:
 Hyperprosopon anale Agassiz, 1861 (Spotfin surfperch)
 Hyperprosopon argenteum Gibbons, 1854 (Walleye surfperch)
 Hyperprosopon ellipticum (Gibbons, 1854) (Silver surfperch)

References

 
Embiotocidae
Marine fish genera